Gabin Jabba, which means in Pashto honey marshes, is located approximately 65 km from Mingora on Matta sakhra road Swat valley, Khyber Pakhtunkhwa the province of Pakistan. It is an area in Swat valley, with green meadows, thick forests, snow clad mountains, mineral springs and high peaks. Gabin Jabba elevation is 2582m (8471ft) from the sea level.

The region has some medicinal plants, and some researchers conduct searches in this region of Swat valley. Honey bees are found here, and the honey of the region is known throughout Khyber Pakhtunkhwa. Gabin Jabba also leads to the famous Daral Lake, which is located approximately 500+ meters higher from Gabin Jabba.

Birds 

The entire track from the base to the top is flooded with songs of several species of birds. The most common ones with melodious vocalizations are the Western Crowned Warblers. Other than that, Variegated Laughingthrush, Blue Whistling Thrush, Eurasian Blackbird, Large-billed crow, Long-tailed Minivet, Brownish-flanked Bush Warbler, Common Myna and Jungle Myna are found in the forested parts of the valley.

The cold stony river supports Plumbeous Redstarts and   Little Forktails quite in good number.

Lalko village
The region of Gabina Jabba is closely linked with the village of Lalko, which is situated to the north of the region and serves as a gateway to Gabin Jabba. It is the first settlement met on the way to Gabin Jabba, from where it can be accessed through a four-wheel drive vehicle. It also hosts a base camp of a trail that leads to an alpine glacial lakes of Daral and Saidgai.

Lalko Valley is located on the northern upper reaches of the Matta Tehsil of Swat Valley, placed at a distance of 55 km away from the headquarter Saidu Sharif, which is a green, forested zone, covered with alpine pastures and receives heavy snowfall in winter season. Sulatanr is located to the western side of the region at lengthy trek.

See also 
Swat Valley

References 

Hill stations in Pakistan
Tourist attractions in Swat